Enclos Corp, referred to as Enclos, is a specialty glazing and exterior facade contractor in the United States. The firm provides design, engineering, fabrication and assembly services for custom curtainwall systems and structural glass facades. Enclos is headquartered in Eagan, Minnesota, and is a subsidiary of CH Holdings USA, Inc.

History 

Started in 1946 under the name Cupples Products, the firm initially manufactured residential window products. Over the years, the firm's scope of work progressed to include the design, engineering, fabrication, assembly and field installation of custom curtainwall systems. The firm operated over the decades under the names of Harmon Contract, Harmon Ltd, and Enclos.

In 2007, Enclos acquired Advanced Structures Inc. (ASI). The firm launched the Advanced Technology Studio of Enclos in Los Angeles, California in 2009. A second Advanced Technology Studio of Enclos was opened in New York City in 2011.

Notable projects 

Allegiant Stadium, Las Vegas, Nevada,
Chase Center, Golden State Warriors Stadium, San Francisco, California, 2019
New Stanford Hospital, Palo Alto, California, 2019
San Francisco Museum of Modern Art expansion, San Francisco, California, 2015
World Trade Center Transportation Hub, Manhattan, New York City, 2015
300 New Jersey Avenue (also referred to as “51 Louisiana Avenue”), Washington, D.C., 2009
432 Park Avenue, Manhattan, New York City, 2015
680 Folsom Street, San Francisco, California, 2013
Fulton Center, Manhattan, New York City, 2014
John Jay College, School of Criminal Justice, Manhattan, New York City, 2011
LA Live, Los Angeles, California, 2010
Music City Center, Nashville, Tennessee, 2013
Newseum, Washington, D.C., 2008
One North Wacker, Chicago, Illinois, 2002
Station Place: Security & Exchange Commission Headquarters, Washington, D.C., 2009.
Bloomberg Tower, Manhattan, New York City, 2005

References 
Notes

Further reading

Boswell, Keith. "Exterior Building Enclosures: Design Process and Composition for Innovative Facades". Wiley.
Hughes, C.J. "Bringing Space and Light to the Underground" Architectural Record (September 2011)
Patterson, Mic. "Structural Glass Facades and Enclosures". Wiley.
Pearson, Clifford. "A local firm with a global practice rethinks the headquarters for the world’s largest charitable foundation" Architectural Record (2012)
Vaglio, Jeffrey and Paterson, Mic. "Seeing Double" US Glass Magazine (March 2011)

External links 

Technology companies established in 1946
Companies based in Eagan, Minnesota
1946 establishments in Minnesota